The 2003 South Florida Bulls football team represented the University of South Florida (USF) in the 2003 college football season.  Their head coach was Jim Leavitt, and the USF Bulls played their home games at Raymond James Stadium in Tampa, FL.  The 2004 college football season was only the 7th season overall for the Bulls, and their first season in Conference USA.

Schedule

References

South Florida
South Florida Bulls football seasons
South Florida Bulls football